The Gillies Ministry was the 29th ministry of the Government of Queensland and was led by Premier William Gillies of the Labor Party. It succeeded the Theodore Ministry on 26 February 1925 following Ted Theodore's resignation, and was in turn succeeded by the McCormack Ministry on 22 October 1925 when Gillies resigned to become a member of the new trade and arbitration board.

On 26 February 1925, the Governor, Sir Matthew Nathan, designated nine principal executive offices of the Government, and appointed the following Members of the Legislative Assembly of Queensland to the Ministry.

References
 
 

Queensland ministries
Australian Labor Party ministries in Queensland